A floodlight is an artificial light providing even illumination across a wide area.
 High-intensity discharge lamp, the class of lamp itself
 Stage lighting instrument, the types associated with Stage productions